The Green Brigade Marching Band is the marching band of the University of North Texas in Denton, home of the North Texas Mean Green.  The band is open to all university students, but is curricular and integral for music education majors.  The Green Brigade is one of approximately 40 student ensembles in the University of North Texas College of Music, a comprehensive music school with the largest enrollment of any music institution accredited by the National Association of Schools of Music.  The band is critically acclaimed and has been featured as an exhibition band for numerous marching festivals — including upcoming exhibition performances at the 2021 Texas UIL State Marching Finals, the 2021 Bands of America DFW regional competition, and taking part in the 2022 Saint Patrick's Day parade in Dublin.

One of several distinct traditions of the Green Brigade is to perform "You'll Never Walk Alone," from the musical Carousel, at the end of football games.

Filmography 
 Necessary Roughness (1991)

Directors of the Green Brigade 
 1945–1974: Maurice McAdow (1904–2001)
 1975–1981: Dr. Robert A. Winslow (1931-2007)
 1982-1996: Dennis Warren Fisher (b. 1949)
 1997-2001: Dr. Bradley Genevro (b. 1966)
 2002: Alfredo Velez (b. 1958) 
 2003–2018: Dr. Nicholas Enrico Williams (b. 1974)
 2019–present: Dr. Daniel Cook (b. 1988)

External links 
 2008 Exhibition, 2008 Texas State Marching Contest

References

Conference USA marching bands
University of North Texas
Music
1945 establishments in Texas